The 2008 Weber State Wildcats football team represented Weber State University as a member of the Big Sky Conference during the 2008 NCAA Division I FCS football season. Led by fourth-year head coach Ron McBride, the Wildcats compiled an overall record of 10–4 with a mark of 7–1 in conference play to share the Big Sky championship with Montana. Weber State received an at-large bid to the NCAA Division I Football Championship playoffs, where they beat Cal Poly in the first round before losing to Montana in the quarterfinals.

Schedule

References

Weber State
Weber State Wildcats football seasons
Weber State Wildcats football